Oleksandr Andriyovych Savoshko (born 22 September 1998) is a Ukrainian professional footballer who plays as a right-back for Ukrainian club Veres Rivne.

Personal life
His brother Volodymyr Savoshko is also a professional footballer.

References

External links
 
 

1998 births
Living people
Sportspeople from Lviv
Ukrainian footballers
Association football defenders
FC Oleksandriya players
FC Lviv players
NK Veres Rivne players
FC Uzhhorod players
Ukrainian First League players
Ukrainian Second League players
Ukrainian Amateur Football Championship players